Arjuna Kamalanath Karunaratne (born 10 September 1975 as අර්ජුන කමලනාත්) [Sinhala]) is an actor in Sri Lankan cinema. Though he became popular as an actor in cinema, Kamalanath also performed as a director, producer and screenplay writer.

Early life
Arjuna Kamalanath was born on 10 September 1975 as the only child. His father is Thilak Karunaratne and mother is Kumudu Buddadhasa. He completed his education from Prince of Wales' College, Moratuwa. He is married to fellow actress Amisha Kavindi.

Beyond acting
He is the chairman of Hela Bala Kala Sansadaya organization. During 2014 Presidential Elections, his organization publicly supported Mahinda Rajapaksa's political campaign.

On 28 May 2018, Kamalanath was appointed as the Joint Managing Director of the MPI Film Circuit.

Career
On August 16, 1998, Kamalanath acted in his first cinema creation, Mohothin Mohotha directed by Sunil Soma Peiris. Then he acted in the film Seetha Rae directed by Dharmashri Wickramasinghe. He mostly acted in many commercial low budget films in adult genre in early days. His first main role in cinema came through 2000 film Thisaravi with the role as a gay. Apart from cinema acting, he also acted in few television serials such as Supiri Tharuwa, Sansara Prarthana, Nilanjana and Wasuda.

Filmography
 No. denotes the Number of Sri Lankan film in the Sri Lankan cinema.

As actor

As director

As producer

As screenplay writer

References

External links
 It’s not a haapy ending for Arjuna and Amisha
 හමුදා සේවයේ සිටියායැයි එල්ල වන චෝදනාවට අර්ජුන කමලනාත්ගෙන් සැර පිළිතුරක්
 චිත්‍රපට සංස්ථාවට කොන්දක් නැ
 මං සිනමාවට ආදරෙයි කලකිරීම් මැද චිත්‍රපට හදන්නේ ඒ නිසයි
 ‘Visirinu Renu’ shows the worlds of six women
 'I Don't know Why?': Canadian-Sri Lankan joint venture

Sinhalese male actors
Living people
1975 births
Sri Lankan male film actors